was a feudal domain under the Tokugawa shogunate of Edo period Japan, located in Tango Province in what is now the northern portion of modern-day Kyoto Prefecture. It was centered around the Miyazu Castle which was located in what is now the city of Miyazu, Kyoto and was controlled by a number of fudai daimyō clans through its history.

History
From the Muromachi period, Tango Province had been under the control of the Isshiki clan. However, in the Sengoku period, Toyotomi Hideyoshi placed the province under the control of Hosokawa Tadaoki. Following the Following the Battle of Sekigahara, Tokugawa Ieyasu awarded the entire province of Tango to Kyōgoku Takatomo, who established Miyazu Domain. To ensure the succession of his line, Kyōgoku Takatomo gave 35,000 koku of his holdings to his third son, Kyōgoku Takamitsu, and established a cadet branch of the clan at Tango-Tanabe Domain, and 10,000 koku to his grandson, Kyōgoku Takamichi, who established Mineyama Domain. This proved to be a wise decision, his grandson  Kyōgoku Takakuni was charged with misconduct and poor governance by the Tokugawa shogunate and reduced to hatamoto  status in 1666.

After a couple years as a tenryō territory, Miyazu was revived for Nagai Nagayuki, formerly of Yodo Domain. His son, Nagai Naonaga was murdered by Naito Tadakatsu of Toba Domain in 1680. As he was without heir, Miyazu was assigned to the Abe clan, Okudaira clan and then to a cadet branch of the Matsudaira clan, the Honjō-Matsudaira, who ruled from 1758 to the Meiji restoration. The 6th daimyō, Matsudaira Munehide served as Kyoto shoshidai, and rōjū during the tumultuous Bakumatsu period. The domain reluctantly fought for the shogunate during Battle of Toba-Fushimi at the opening of the Boshin War, but switched sides shortly after the defeat of Tokugawa forces. Miyazu Domain became "Miyazu Prefecture" in 1871, then part of "Toyooka Prefecture" before becoming part of Kyoto Prefecture in 1876.  The Honjo-Matsudaira clan was later ennobled with the kazoku peerage title of shishaku (viscount).

Holdings at the end of the Edo period
As with most domains in the han system, Miyazu Domain consisted of several discontinuous territories calculated to provide the assigned kokudaka, based on periodic cadastral surveys and projected agricultural yields. 

Tango Province 
7 villages in Naka District
28 villages in Takeno District
84 villages in Yosa District
11 villages in Kasa District
Ōmi Province
1 village in Kurita District
1 village in Yasu District
11 villages in Kōga District
6 villages in Gamō District

List of daimyō 

{| class=wikitable
! #||Name || Tenure || Courtesy title || Court Rank || kokudaka 
|-
|colspan=6|  Kyōgoku clan, 1600-1666 (Tozama)
|-
||1||||1600 - 1622||Tango-no-kami (丹後守); Jiju (侍従)|| Junior 4th Rank, Lower Grade (従四位下)||123,000 koku
|-
||2||||1622 - 1654||Tango-no-kami (丹後守)|| Junior 4th Rank, Lower Grade (従四位下)||78,000 koku
|-
||3||||1654 - 1666||Tango-no-kami (丹後守); Jiju (侍従)|| Junior 4th Rank, Lower Grade (従四位下)||78,000 koku
|-
|colspan=6|  tenryō　1666 - 1669
|-
|colspan=6|  Nagai clan, 1669-1680 (Fudai)
|-
||1||||1669 - 1673||Ukon-no-taifu(右近夫)|| Junior 5th Rank, Lower Grade (従五位下)||73,000 koku
|-
||2||||1673 - 1680||Shinano-no-kami (信濃守)|| Junior 5th Rank, Lower Grade (従五位下)||73,000 koku
|-
|colspan=6|  Abe clan, 1681-1697 (Fudai)
|-
||1||||1681 - 1697||Tsushima-no-kami (対馬守)|| Junior 5th Rank, Lower Grade (従五位下)||99,000 koku
|-
|colspan=6|  Okudaira clan, 1697-1717 (Fudai)
|-
||1||||1697 - 1717||Daizen-no-daibu (大膳大夫)|| Junior 4th Rank, Lower Grade (従四位下)||90,000 koku
|-
|colspan=6|  Aoyama clan, 1717-1758 (Fudai)
|-
||1||||1717 - 1744||Daizen-no-suke (大膳亮)|| Junior 5th Rank, Lower Grade (従五位下)||48,000 koku
|-
||2||||1744 - 1758||Yamato-no-kami (大和守)|| Junior 5th Rank, Lower Grade (従五位下)||48,000 koku
|-
|colspan=6|  Honjō-Matsudaira clan, 1758-1871 (Fudai)
|-
||1||||1758 - 1761|| Iyo-no-kami (伊予守)|| Junior 5th Rank, Lower Grade (従五位下)||70,000 koku
|-
||2||||1761 - 1765||Osumi-no-kami (大隅守)||  Junior 5th Rank, Lower Grade (従五位下)||70,000 koku|-
||3||||1765 - 1795|| Iyo-no-kami  (伊予守)|| Junior 5th Rank, Lower Grade (従五位下)||70,000 koku|-
||4||||1795 - 1808||Osumi-no-kami (大隅守)||  Junior 5th Rank, Lower Grade (従五位下)||70,000 koku
|-
||5||||1808 - 1840||Hoki-no-kami (伯耆守); Jiju(侍従)|| Junior 4th Rank, Lower Grade (従四位下)||70,000 koku
|-
||6||||1841 - 1866||Hoki-no-kami (伯耆守); Jiju(侍従)|| Junior 4th Rank, Lower Grade (従四位下)||70,000 koku
|-
||7||||1866 - 1871||Hoki-no-kami (伯耆守); || Junior 4th Rank, Lower Grade (従四位下)||70,000 koku
|}

See also 
 List of Han
 Abolition of the han system

Further reading
 Bolitho, Harold. (1974). Treasures Among Men: The Fudai Daimyo in Tokugawa Japan. New Haven: Yale University Press.  ;  OCLC 185685588

References

Domains of Japan
1600 establishments in Japan
States and territories established in 1600
1871 disestablishments in Japan
States and territories disestablished in 1871
Tango Province
History of Kyoto Prefecture